"The Little Black Boy" is a poem by William Blake included in Songs of Innocence in 1789. It was published during a time when slavery was still legal and the campaign for the abolition of slavery was still young.

Interpretation
In accordance with the running metaphor of the sun, the fact that Blake speaks of "black bodies" and a "sunburnt face" in the fourth stanza seems to imply that black people are near God as a result of their suffering – for one can only become dark and sunburned as a result of being exposed to the sun's rays. In the final stanza this idea is developed further, as the black boy says that he will "shade him [the English boy] from the heat", this implies that the English boy's pale skin is not used to the heat (derived from God's love) – some critics assert that the paleness of the English boy in this poem is symbolic of the fact that the English were distanced from God as a result of their treatment of the black peoples.

In the 5th stanza, we see all of humanity being united:

In the 6th stanza this metaphor is continued:

Here, Blake uses the clouds as a metaphor for the human body. These stanzas therefore imply that after physical life has passed, all will be united with God.

Also relevant to this poem is Blake's use in other works of politically neutral colours such as gold and silver when describing things of moral value. The most valuable things in life, in terms of spirituality and wisdom are anointed with colours that are indifferent to race and social class, yet are related to financial status, as gold and silver evoke images of precious metals.

Gallery
Scholars agree that "The Little Black Boy" is the ninth object in the order of the original printings of the Songs of Innocence and of Experience. The following represents a comparison of several of the extant original copies of the poem, their print date, their order in that particular printing of the poems, and their holding institution:

References

External links 

Comparison of extant copies of the original prints of "The Little Blake Boy" by Blake at the William Blake Archive
 Tate Online, engravings
 Abolition Literature

1789 poems
Songs of Innocence and of Experience